Morten Nielsen may refer to:

  (1922-1944), Danish poet
 Morten Nielsen (born 19??), Danish bioinformatician 
 Morten Nielsen (footballer born 1990), Danish footballer
 Morten Nielsen (footballer born 1982), Danish footballer
 Morten Nielsen (footballer born 1971), former Danish footballer
 Morten Nielsen (rower) (born 1980), Danish Olympic rower
 Morten Nielsen (sailor) (born 1960), Danish Olympic sailor
 Morten B. Nielsen (born 1974), former Danish footballer